Asaluria is a genus of snout moths. It was described by Hans Georg Amsel in 1958 and contains the species Asaluria reisseri. It is found in Iran.

References

Anerastiini
Monotypic moth genera
Moths of Asia
Pyralidae genera
Taxa named by Hans Georg Amsel